John A. Coleman Catholic High School was a private, Roman Catholic high school in Hurley, New York.  It was under the control of the Roman Catholic Archdiocese of New York until 2001.  From its inception in 1966 until its closing in 2019, Coleman Catholic contained grades 9–12.

Background

Coleman Catholic closed down officially on August 31, 2019.

Athletics

Coleman Catholic was a member of the Mid-Hudson Athletic League (MHAL) and competed in Division 4 along with the high schools of Millbrook, Rhinebeck, and Webutuck. Other MHAL member schools are Dover, Ellenville, Highland, Hyde Park, Marlboro, New Paltz, Onteora, Pine Plains, Red Hook, Rondout Valley, Saugerties, Spackenkill and Wallkill. The MHAL is within Section 9 the New York State Public High School Athletic Association (NYSPHSAA).

Kingston Daily Freeman Player of the year Ryan Johnson 2005

Coleman Catholic is the only Class D team in the MHAL.

Coleman participated in Varsity, JV, and modified sports, including Soccer (Boys/Girls); Basketball (Boys/Girls); Baseball (Boys); Softball (Girls); Golf (Boys); Track (Boys/Girls); Cross Country (Boys/Girls); Tennis (Boys/Girls); Volleyball (Girls).

Coleman Boys Basketball was a Class C team as of the 2014–15 season.

Coleman Girls Basketball was a Class B team as of the 2012–13 season.

Here are past Championships won by Coleman Catholic:

League Championships

Boys' Basketball: MHAL 1983–84, 1984–85; MHAL Division IV 2007–8, 2008–09, 2009–10, 2010–11, 2012–13

Girls' Basketball: MHAL 2009–10; MHAL Division IV 2007–2008, 2008–2009, 2011–2012

Baseball: MHAL 1977, 1982; MHAL Division IV 2005

Boys' Cross Country: 1973, 1974, 1975, 1978, 1979, 1980, 1981, 1987, 1989

Girls' Tennis: MHAL 1988, 2003, 2004, 2005

Field Hockey: MHAL 1980, 1981, 1985

Golf: 1973, 1976, 1977, 1989

Section 9 Championships

Boys' Basketball (Class C): 1983–84; (Class D): 1984–85, 2006–07, 2007–08, 2008–09, 2009–10, 2011–12, 2012–13, 2013–14

Girls' Basketball (Class D): 2003–04, 2007–08, 2008–09, 2009–10, 2010–11, (Class C): 2011–12, (Class B) 2012–13

Baseball (Class B): 1977, 1982, 1983; (Class D): 1992, 1995, 1998, 2012, 2013, 2014

Boys' Cross Country (Class B): 1974, 1978, 1979, 1980, 1981; (Class D) 2007

Girls' Cross Country (Class D): 2006, 2007, 2010

Boys' Outdoor Track and Field (Class D): 2001, 2002

Girls' Outdoor Track and Field (Class D): 1992, 1993, 1994, 1996, 1997, 1998, 1999, 2002, 2003, 2004, 2005, 2006, 2007

Volleyball (Class D): 1991, 2003, 2004, 2006, 2012

Girls' Tennis (Singles): Dawn Brownlie; 1988; Dana Postupack; 2003, 2004, 2005

Girls' Soccer: 2010, 2011,

State Regional Championships

Boys' Basketball (Class C): 1983–84; (Class D) 1984–85, 2009–10, 2010–11, 2013–14

Girls' Basketball (Class D): 2007–08, 2008–09, 2009–10, 2010–11 (Class C): 2011–12

State Championships

Girls' Tennis (Singles): Dana Postupack; 2003, 2004, 2005

Girls' Basketball (Class D): 2008–09, 2010–11

Boys' Baseball: 1977, 2012

Theater
In the fall of 2010, John A. Coleman was among the first high schools in the country to be given the rights to perform the musical, The Phantom of the Opera, in its entirety. This accomplishment was so significant that it received international coverage in BroadwayWorld.com.  The Broadway company of "Phantom of the Opera" took an interest in the Coleman production and invited the cast to see the Broadway show as their guests. After the show the student-actors were invited into the stars dressing rooms to meet and discuss the show. The Coleman student-actors were then taken on a tour of set, the backstage, and technical workings of the Majestic Theater. The spring 2011 Coleman production of The Secret Garden also attracted the attention of the Broadway community; the Coleman cast traveled to New York City where it met and sang from the show for original Broadway cast members.

References

Catholic secondary schools in New York (state)
Schools in Ulster County, New York
Educational institutions established in 1966
1966 establishments in New York (state)